Neighbors is a 1920 two-reel silent  comedy film co-written, co-directed by, and starring Buster Keaton.

Plot
"The Boy" and "the Girl" are young lovers who live in tenements, the rear of which face each other, with backyards separated by a wooden fence. Their families constantly feud over the lovers' relationship. Each morning the Boy and the Girl exchange love letters through holes in the fence, much to the dismay of their families who insist they stay away from one another. The Boy sneaks into the Girl's bedroom window as the parents are arguing but he is caught by the Girl's father who ties him to a clothes line and slowly sends him back over to his family's house. After much arguing and fighting the two families eventually go to court to settle their differences. The Boy demands the right to marry the Girl, and the judge insists that the two families not interfere in their plans.

On the day of the wedding the two families are naturally hostile to one another. After the wedding is delayed due to the Boy's belt repeatedly breaking and in his pants continuously falling down, the Girl's father discovers that the ring the Boy intends to give to her is a cheap 10-cent ring purchased from Woolworths. He angrily calls off the wedding and drags the Girl home. Determined to rescue his love and with the help of his two groomsmen, the Boy uses trapeze skills to snag the Girl and the two run off together. They eventually find themselves in the coal shed of a blacksmith who has been ordained as a minister who pronounces them husband and wife.

Cast
 Buster Keaton as The Boy
 Virginia Fox as The Girl
 Joe Roberts as The Girl's Father
 Joe Keaton as The Boy's Father
 Edward F. Cline as The Cop
 Jack Duffy as The Judge
 The Flying Escalantes as Themselves

See also
 List of American films of 1920
 Buster Keaton filmography

References

External links
 
 
 Neighbors - Movie Short with piano score
 Neighbors on YouTube
 
 Neighbors at the International Buster Keaton Society

1920 films
1920 comedy films
American black-and-white films
Films directed by Buster Keaton
Films directed by Edward F. Cline
American silent short films
Silent American comedy films
Films produced by Joseph M. Schenck
Films with screenplays by Buster Keaton
Articles containing video clips
1920s English-language films
1920s American films